Champakulam Pachu Pillai is a Kathakali exponent from Kerala, India. He was a specialist in the thadi or bearded roles in kathakali. He has been honored with several noted awards including the Sangeet Natak Akademi Award 1983, Kerala Sangeetha Nataka Akademi Award 1969 and Kerala Kalamandalam Award 1991.

Biography
Pachu Pillai was born in Perumanur family in Champakulam village of Alappuzha district in 1907 as eldest son of Madhaviyamma and Kaipilly Sankarapilla. The Perumannur family was one of the main tributaries of the Kaplinjedal Kathakalichitta known as the Southern Chitta in Kathakali performance. Guru Gopinath, a famous dancer and choreographer, is his younger brother. Pillai started learning kathakali from his maternal uncle Champakulam Sanku Pillai at the age of 14. He made his debut at the age of 16, as Rukman in Rukminiswayamvaram kathakali performed at the Nedumudi Mathur Bhagwati Temple. According to the Guru's wishes, Patchu Pillai joined the Mathur Kathakali yogam in which he was also a member. The 1993 Kathakali Festival organized by Sangeet Natak Academy in Delhi was inaugurated by Patchu Pillai.

Pachu Pillai's notable roles include rough and heroic characters like Dushasana, Bali, Trigarthan Bakan, Kali and Nakrathundi.

He died on May 10, 2004, at the age of 98.

Awards and honors
Kerala Sangeetha Nataka Akademi Award 1969
Kerala Kalamandalam Award 1991
Sangeet Natak Akademi Award 1983
Kerala state Kathakali Award 2002
Kerala Sangeetha Nataka Akademi Fellowship 1982
Gold Medal at Kerala Kalamandalam Silver Jubilee Celebrations
Patchupillai was honored by rulers of Travancore like Thirunal Maharani and Chithira Thirunal Maharaja.

References

1939 births
2004 deaths
20th-century Indian dancers
Dancers from Kerala
Kathakali exponents
People from Alappuzha district
Recipients of the Sangeet Natak Akademi Award
Malayali people
Indian male dancers
Recipients of the Kerala Sangeetha Nataka Akademi Fellowship
Recipients of the Kerala Sangeetha Nataka Akademi Award